The 1982–83 season was the 103rd season of competitive football by Rangers.

Overview
Rangers played a total of 57 competitive matches during the 1982–83 season. Greig made big-money signings in the pre-season 1982–83 with renewed hope that they could at least mount a serious title challenge, but once again, the season ended in trophyless failure. Dave MacKinnon - £30,000 from Partick Thistle, Craig Paterson - £200,000 from Hibernian, Robert Prytz from Malmö FF and Sandy Clark from West Ham United, were all welcomed to the club.

The early signs were positive. Rangers reached the 1982 Scottish League Cup Final scoring en route 29 goals in there ten games and eliminated Borussia Dortmund from the UEFA Cup. The opening eight league games saw the side unbeaten but the final match saw Rangers lying in fourth, a massive eighteen points behind champions Dundee United. The team was knocked out of Europe after suffering a 5–0 defeat from Cologne. The 1983 Scottish Cup Final was lost to an Aberdeen side that had won the European Cup Winner's Cup ten days earlier, their double allowing Rangers to take Scotland's Cup Winners' Cup berth for the following season.

Results
All results are written with Rangers' score first.

Scottish Premier Division

UEFA Cup

Scottish Cup

League Cup

Appearances

League table

See also
 1982–83 in Scottish football
 1982–83 Scottish Cup
 1982–83 Scottish League Cup
 1982–83 UEFA Cup

References 

Rangers F.C. seasons
Rangers